"Cool On Your Island" is a song by the band Y Kant Tori Read, commercially released by Atlantic Records in 1988 as a 7" vinyl single and a cassette single. Two versions of a promotional 7" vinyl were also released, one with light blue labels and one with dark blue labels. The song was a commercial failure and received absolutely no critical comment. After the failure of the first single by the band, the label did not feel expenses were warranted to film a music video.

The promotional 7" vinyl singles feature a double A-side of an edited version of the track. There was also a promotional CD single issued for the Phil Collins song "A Groovy Kind of Love". Inexplicably it featured "Cool on Your Island" as tracks 2 and 3; the album and edit versions. The track would go on to be a favourite for Amos to perform at live concerts later in her career.

Amos has told a story on The Rosie O'Donnell Show regarding an incident where the release of this single may have kept her out of harm. She states that between the failure of "Y Kant Tori Read" and her successful solo career she was detained by German police while travelling because a friend (and co-traveller) had marijuana on her person. When the police were interrogating her, she stated she was a musician and that she had been "on a record with Phil Collins." As he was extremely popular there at the time, she was set free.

Track listing
7" Single (Atlantic 7-89021) and Cassette Single (Atlantic 89021-4)
"Cool on Your Island" – 4:57
"Heart Attack at 23" – 5:16

7" Promo Single (Atlantic 7-89021)
"Cool on Your Island" (Edit) – 4:05
"Cool on Your Island" (Edit) – 4:05

CD Promo Single (Atlantic PR2452)
"A Groovy Kind of Love" by Phil Collins – 3:25
"Cool on Your Island" (Edit) – 4:05
"Cool on Your Island" (LP version) – 4:57

References

External links
Official Tori Amos website
The Y Kant Tori Read FAQ

1988 singles
Y Kant Tori Read songs
Songs written by Tori Amos
Songs written by Kim Bullard
1988 songs
Atlantic Records singles